Missus may signify

 The spoken pronunciation of Mrs., often jocular or in dialect
 Missus dominicus, an "envoy of the lord" in Frankish court culture.

See also

 
 
 Miss (disambiguation)
 Mister (disambiguation)
 MRS (disambiguation)
 MS (disambiguation)